Lawn Bowls at the 2015 Pacific Games was held 13–18 July 2015 in Port Moresby, Papua New Guinea.

Medal summary

Medal table

Men's results

Women's results

See also
 Lawn bowls at the Pacific Games

References

2015 Pacific Games
Lawn bowls at the Pacific Games
Pacific Games